The Tereshchenko Diamond, sometimes known as the Tereshchenko Blue, is a 42.92 carat diamond of blue colour that is cut in the pear shape. The diamond is rare, belonging to the Type IIb diamond, and believed to originate from India. The Tereshchenko diamond is the second biggest blue diamond in the world. Shaped by Cartier for a private order by the Tereshchenko family, the diamond is in the rare Type IIb diamond.

History

India
Like the Hope Diamond, the blue diamond "Tereshchenko" was found in India, near Golconda, in Kollur mine in the Guntur district of Andhra Pradesh (which at the time was part of the Golconda kingdom), in the seventeenth century.

Ukraine (Russian Empire period) 
The original owner of the diamond is the Tereshchenko family.

The diamond weighed 150 carats before the cut and was secretly brought from India especially for Mykhailo Tereshchenko. The "Tereshchenko Diamond" is the world's largest blue diamond and is the second largest diamond to the "Hope", which belonged to the French crown.  However, after the French Revolution, the diamond  went to England and the United States. This blue diamond was cut in France in 1673, it weighed 67 carats and was also referred to a very rare Type IIb diamond.  After the cut the blue diamond "Hope" weighed 44 carats.

The biggest order in the history of the House of Cartier
After the Cartier cut, "The Tereshchenko Blue" weighed 42.92 carats. It had an ideal form of cut – a "pear" shape. The Tereshchenko diamond took its place in the classification of the rarest Type IIb diamond.
The jeweler from the Place Vendôme in Paris, made it the centerpiece of necklace, where harmoniously conjoined forty-six intoxicating diamonds, weighing from 0.13 to 2.88 carats with cut of all kinds of shapes: "marquis", round, "pear", "heart" and variety of colors: pale yellow, lemon, aqua, Persian green, golden-yellow, grey, blue, purple, pink, bright orange and bright yellow. This necklace will remain one of the biggest orders in the history of the House of Cartier.

The curse controversy

Hope Diamond and Tereshchenko Diamond
According to legend, these two stones Hope Diamond and Tereshchenko Diamond with the same deep blue radiance, in the late nineteenth and early twentieth century, were stolen from the eyes of a sculpted statue of the goddess Sita, the wife of Rama, the seventh Avatar of Vishnu, and were then shipped to Europe. This legend is used to explain the tragic events in the life of Mykhailo Tereshchenko, the Tereshchenko family and Russia after Mikhail became the owner of the gem. However, much like the "curse of Tutankhamun", this general type of "legend" was most likely the invention of Western authors during the Victorian era.

See also
Heart of the ocean
List of diamonds

References

Individual diamonds
Diamonds originating in India
Tereshchenko family
Blue diamonds